The canton of Condé-en-Brie is a former administrative division in northern France. It was disbanded following the French canton reorganisation which came into effect in March 2015. It consisted of 27 communes, which joined the new canton of Essômes-sur-Marne in 2015. It had 8,796 inhabitants (2012).

The canton comprised the following communes:

Artonges
Barzy-sur-Marne
Baulne-en-Brie
Celles-lès-Condé
La Celle-sous-Montmirail
La Chapelle-Monthodon
Chartèves
Condé-en-Brie
Connigis
Courboin
Courtemont-Varennes
Crézancy
Fontenelle-en-Brie
Jaulgonne
Marchais-en-Brie
Mézy-Moulins
Monthurel
Montigny-lès-Condé
Montlevon
Pargny-la-Dhuys
Passy-sur-Marne
Reuilly-Sauvigny
Rozoy-Bellevalle
Saint-Agnan
Saint-Eugène
Trélou-sur-Marne
Viffort

Demographics

See also
Cantons of the Aisne department

References

Former cantons of Aisne
2015 disestablishments in France
States and territories disestablished in 2015